The 2003 Swisscom Challenge, also known as the Zurich Open, was a women's tennis tournament played on indoor hard courts that was part of the Tier I Series of the 2003 WTA Tour. It was the 20th edition of the tournament and took place at the Schluefweg in Zürich, Switzerland, from 13 October until 19 October 2003. Second-seeded Justine Henin-Hardenne won the singles title and earned $189,000 first-prize money. With this victory Henin-Hardenne became the new world No. 1 ranked singles player.

Finals

Singles

 Justine Henin-Hardenne defeated  Jelena Dokić, 6–0, 6–4
 It was Henin-Hardenne's 8th singles title of the year and the 14th of her career.

Doubles

 Kim Clijsters /   Ai Sugiyama defeated  Virginia Ruano Pascual /  Paola Suárez 7–6(7–3), 6–2

References

External links
 ITF tournament edition details
 Tournament draws

Swisscom Challenge
2003
2003 in Swiss tennis
October 2003 sports events in Europe
2003 in Swiss women's sport